Estia Joseph Eichten (born 1946), is an American theoretical physicist, of the Fermi National Accelerator Laboratory (Fermilab).  He received his Ph.D. in 1972 from the MIT Center for Theoretical Physics, where he was a student of Roman Jackiw's, and was Associate Professor of Physics at Harvard before joining the Fermilab Theoretical Physics Department in 1982.

In 1984 Eichten coauthored "Supercollider Physics" (with Kenneth Lane, Ian Hinchliffe and Chris Quigg), which has strongly influenced the quest for future discoveries at hadron colliders, such as the Fermilab Tevatron, the SSC, and the LHC at CERN.   He has made many other significant contributions, including the study of the spectroscopy of heavy-light mesons (for which he was an originator of the idea of heavy quark symmetry),  quarkonium, and "technicolor" theories of dynamical electroweak symmetry breaking.

In 2011 Eichten with Chris Quigg, Ian Hinchliffe, and Kenneth Lane won the J. J. Sakurai Prize for Theoretical Particle Physics "For their work, separately and collectively, to chart a course of the exploration of TeV scale physics using multi-TeV hadron colliders"

References

External links
 Eichten's publications on SPIRES.

Living people
21st-century American physicists
Harvard University faculty
1946 births
Fellows of the American Physical Society
Theoretical physicists
J. J. Sakurai Prize for Theoretical Particle Physics recipients
People from Stillwater, Minnesota
MIT Center for Theoretical Physics alumni